Chief Saab is a 1996 Pakistani musical comedy film, directed by Javed Sheikh and starring himself, Neeli, Saleem Sheikh and Meera in the lead roles. It was a super-hit musical film of 1996.

Cast
Javed Sheikh
Neeli
Saleem Sheikh
Meera
Behroze Sabzwari
Zeba Bakhtiar
Ismail Tara
Mustafa Qureshi
 Asif Khan

Music
The music was arranged by Amjad Bobby. The film song lyrics were penned by Saleem Ahmad Saleem and Athar Zaman. The songs were sung by famous playback singers Shazia Manzoor, Fariha Pervez, Sajjad Ali and Waris Baig. Some of the songs became most popular among the public, especially the song " MAIN NE TUJHE KHOYA TAU AISA LAGA" written by Athar Zaman  and separately sung by Waris Baig and Shazia Manzoor attracted much attention of the audience. Other significant tracks are:

 Bas Bhaii Bas Ziada Baat Nahin, Chief Sahib ... Sung by Sajjad Ali
 Sunu Sunu, Bolo Bolo Mera Tum Pe Dil Aa Gaya ... Sung by Shazia Manzoor and Waris Baig
 Raat Nasheeli, Nazrein Mila Lay ... Sung by Fariha Pervez and Waris Baig

Awards
 Nigar Award for Best Comedian Ismail Tara in Chief Sahib (1996).

References

External links
 

1996 films
1990s Urdu-language films
Pakistani musical comedy films
1990s musical comedy films
1996 comedy films
Films scored by Amjad Bobby
Nigar Award winners
Urdu-language Pakistani films